HAScript, or Host Access Script, is an IBM-developed macro language with an XML syntax designed for programmatic interaction with terminal-based applications. HAScript is based on a state machine principle. The first commercial implementation appeared in IBM's Host On-Demand in the late 1990s.

IBM software products that use HAScript include WebSphere Host On-Demand (HOD), Personal Communications, and WebSphere Host Access Transformation Services (HATS). When accessing the IBM Mainframe the HAScript API allows for Host emulation whereby information from the host screen can be retrieved and reformatted within a webpage, or other software application.  There has been limited adoption of HAScript as it requires an intense amount of system resources, general process overhead and Java virtual machine resources.  To date, the implementation of HAScript by other software companies has been mild as the language used for communication is not universally standardized.

External links
 Host On-Demand Macro Programming Guide

HAScript
Scripting languages